Plagiotremus flavus is a species of combtooth blenny from Fiji, and Tonga, in the western central Pacific Ocean. It attacks other fish to feed on mucus and scales. In Fiji this species is a Batesian mimic of Meiacanthus oualanensis in Fiji and of Meiacanthus tongaensis in Tonga.

References

External links
 

Fish described in 1976
flavus